The 2016 Clásica de Almería was the 31st edition of the Clásica de Almería cycle race and was held on 14 February 2016. The race, originally intended to be  but cut short due to strong winds, started in Almería and finished in Roquetas de Mar. The race was won by Leigh Howard.

General classification

References

2016
2016 in road cycling
2016 in Spanish sport